The 2013 World Junior Ice Hockey Championship Division III was played in one group of six teams.  The tournament was played in Sofia, Bulgaria, between 14 and 20 January 2013. The UAE was to have made their first appearance, but forfeited all games for not fulfilling minimum registration requirements.  Their games were still played, but did not count in the standings.

Participants

Officials

Referees
  Luka Kamšek
  Jonathan Liptrott
  Christian Potocan
  Alexei Roshchyn

Linesmen
  Youngjin Chae
  Viesturs Levalds
  Manuel Nikolic
  Orri Sigmarsson
  Luchezar Stoyanov
  Tzvetko Tanev
  Chris van Grinsven

Final standings

The UAE played each team in an exhibition schedule, losing each game with a combined total of two goals for and sixty-eight goals against.

Results
All times are local. (Eastern European Time – UTC+2)

References

External links
IIHF.com
Official standings

III
World Junior Ice Hockey Championships – Division III
International ice hockey competitions hosted by Bulgaria
World